Heartland is the eighth studio album by American rapper Nelly. It was released on August 27, 2021, via Columbia Records. It features guest appearances from Florida Georgia Line, Blanco Brown, Breland, Chris Bandi, City Spud, Darius Rucker, George Birge, Jimmie Allen and Kane Brown. The album peaked at number 45 on the US Billboard 200 and at number 37 in Canada.

Track listing

Charts

Weekly charts

Year-end charts

References

 

2021 albums
Nelly albums
Country rap albums
Columbia Records albums